The 1988–89 Irish League Cup (known as the Roadferry Freight League Cup for sponsorship reasons) was the third edition of Northern Ireland's secondary football knock-out cup competition. It concluded on 30 November 1988 with the final.

Coleraine were the defending champions after defeating Portadown 1–0 in the previous final. The same two clubs met in the second round this season, with Portadown knocking out the holders. Glentoran were the eventual winners, becoming the third different winner of the competition in its first three seasons. They defeated arch-rivals Linfield 2–1 in the final.

The final was notable for the Glentoran goalkeeper Alan Paterson, scoring what turned out to be the winning goal. This was the first time that a goalkeeper had ever scored in a British football final.

First round

|}

Second round

|}

Quarter-finals

 (played at Windsor Park)

|}

Semi-finals

|}

Final

References

Lea
1988–89 domestic association football cups
1988-89